Gharandal is a town in the Tafilah Governorate in southern Jordan, located about  south-southeast of the governorate capital Tafilah. It is identified with Arindela, a town in the late Roman province of Palaestina Salutaris, also called Palaestina Tertia.

Description
Arindela was also a Christian bishopric. One of its bishops, Theodorus, took part in the Council of Ephesus in 431. Another, Macarius, participated in a council held at Jerusalem in 536. No longer a residential bishopric, Arindela is today listed by the Catholic Church as a titular see.

It was held by al-Baladhuri to have surrendered without resistance to one of the chief commanders of the conquest, Yazid ibn Abi Sufyan. It became part of the large military district of Damascus. The 9th-century geographer al-Yaqubi mentions that it was the center of the Jibal subdistrict and its population at that time consisted of Ghassanid and Balqayn tribesmen. By the 10th century, the center of Jibal shifted to the neighboring town of Ruwath. In the 13th century, it is mentioned as a village by the geographer Yaqut al-Hamawi.

The Byzantine and Islamic remains of old Gharandal, the name by which it is presently known, have largely been overtaken by the modern town of the same name. Most of the modern town's population, which was 4,680 in the 2015 Jordanian census, were originally from nearby Buseira and the town is part of the Buseira District of the Tafilah Governorate.

References

Bibliography

Archaeological sites in Jordan
Catholic titular sees in Asia
Populated places in Tafilah Governorate
Ghassanids